The Shearing Touch is a 1960 album by the George Shearing quintet and orchestra, arranged by Billy May.

The AllMusic reviewer commented on the album containing "unorthodox time signatures, incorporating classical techniques, as well as using light pop melodies, accents, and subtle rhythms".

Track listing
"Autumn Nocturne" (Josef Myrow, Kim Gannon) – 2:42
"Nola" (Felix Arndt, James Burns) – 2:28
"Misty" (Erroll Garner, Johnny Burke) – 2.41
"Canadian Sunset" (Eddie Heywood, Norman Gimbel) – 2:56
"Autumn Leaves" (Joseph Kosma, Johnny Mercer, Jacques Prévert) – 2:29
"Like Young" (André Previn) – 2:44
"Sunrise Serenade" (Frankie Carle, Jack Lawrence) – 3:01
"Honeysuckle Rose" (Fats Waller, Andy Razaf) – 2:25
"Snowfall" (Claude Thornhill) – 2:05
"Tonight We Love" (Bobby Worth) – 2:20
"Bewitched, Bothered and Bewildered" (Richard Rodgers, Lorenz Hart) – 2:32
"One O'Clock Jump" (Count Basie) – 2:10

Personnel
George Shearing – piano
Billy May – arranger

References

1960 albums
George Shearing albums
Albums arranged by Billy May
Albums produced by Dave Cavanaugh
Capitol Records albums